Bacarra, officially the Municipality of Bacarra is a 3rd class municipality in the province of Ilocos Norte, Philippines. According to the 2020 census, it has a population of 33,496 people.

Geography 
Bacarra is bounded on the north by the Municipality of Pasuquin, on the east by Vintar; on the south by Laoag City; and on the west by the South China Sea. Bacarra is one of the municipalities with the smallest land area in the province.

Barangays 
Bacarra is politically subdivided into 43 barangays. These barangays are headed by elected officials: Barangay Captain, Barangay Council, whose members are called Barangay Councilors. All are elected every three years.

 Brgy. 1, Sta. Rita (Pob.)
 Brgy. 2, San Andres I (Pob.)
 Brgy. 3, San Andres II (Pob.)
 Brgy. 4, San Simon I (Pob.)
 Brgy. 5, San Simon II (Pob.)
 Brgy. 6, San Pedro I (Pob.)
 Brgy. 7, San Pedro II (Pob.)
 Brgy. 8, San Agustin I (Pob.)
 Brgy. 9, San Agustin II (Pob.)
 Brgy. 10, San Vicente (Pob.)
 Brgy. 11, Sta. Filomena I (Pob.)
 Brgy. 12, Sta. Filomena II (Pob.)
 Brgy. 13, San Gabriel I (Pob.)
 Brgy. 14, San Gabriel II (Pob.)
 Brgy. 15, San Roque I (Pob.)
 Brgy. 16, San Roque II (Pob.)
 Brgy. 17, Sto. Cristo I (Pob.)
 Brgy. 18, Sto. Cristo II (Pob.)
 Brgy. 19, Nambaran
 Brgy. 19-A, Tambidao
 Brgy. 20, Pulangi
 Brgy. 21, Libtong
 Brgy. 22, Bani
 Brgy. 23, Paninaan
 Brgy. 24, Macupit
 Brgy. 25, Tubburan
 Brgy. 26, Teppang
 Brgy. 27, Duripes
 Brgy. 27-A, Pungto
 Brgy. 28, Cabusligan
 Brgy. 29, Pasngal
 Brgy. 30, Cadaratan
 Brgy. 31, Calioet-Libong
 Brgy. 32, Corocor
 Brgy. 33, Cabulalaan
 Brgy. 34, Cabaruan
 Brgy. 35, Pipias
 Brgy. 36, Natba
 Brgy. 37, Ganagan
 Brgy. 37-A, Casilian
 Brgy. 38, Sangil
 Brgy. 39, Pasiocan
 Brgy. 40, Buyon

Climate

Demographics

Economy

Government 
Bacarra, belonging to the first congressional district of the province of Ilocos Norte, is governed by a mayor designated as its local chief executive and by a municipal council as its legislative body in accordance with the Local Government Code. The mayor, vice mayor, and the councilors are elected directly by the people through an election which is being held every three years.

Elected officials 

Term of Office: July 1, 2022 – June 30, 2025.

List of former town executives

1898–Present

Municipal seal 

 Shield, derived from the Provincial Seal of Ilocos Norte.
 Blue, symbolizes the incessant of peace for love, justice equality and tranquility, the purity of heart and open mind of the people of Bacarra, Ilocos Norte towards progress. It also depicts the fervent hopes and prayers of the people to reach their goals in their pursuit for economic recovery through productivity and self-reliance.
 Yellow, represents the burning desire and initiative of the people to attain reconciliation through the power of love and prayer.
 Brown, represents the basic race which the people take pride in the cultivation of the soil through their own sweat and blood.
 Leaning Tower, depicts the strength and sturdiness of the people to withstand the challenges of life in the passage of time. It also expresses the dignity of labor.
 Carabao and Plow, symbolize the basic factors of production which are of paramount importance in attaining the fondest dreams of the people to become active, viable, self-reliant and productive.
 Tobacco and Garlic, represent the two major agricultural cash crops of the people thereby attaining self-reliant.

Sister city 
According to the Sister Cities International, Bacarra is a sister city of Maui, Hawaii.

References

External links

[ Philippine Standard Geographic Code]
Philippine Census Information
Local Governance Performance Management System

Municipalities of Ilocos Norte